The Bewitch Stakes is a Grade III American Thoroughbred horse race for fillies and mares four-year-olds and older over a distance of  miles on the turf held annually in April at Keeneland Race Course, Lexington, Kentucky during the spring meeting. The event currently offers a purse of $300,000.

History

The race is named for Calumet Farm's great Hall of Fame filly, Bewitch. Bewitch won her first two races as a two-year-old at Keeneland. The first event was on 10 April 1947, a maiden, The Dixiana Purse
a four furlong race in which Bewitch won easily. The following week Bewitch won the Thoroughbred Club Dinner Purse equaling the track record in 46 seconds flat for the four furlong distance that was held by Odessa Beulah since 27 April 1937. Bewitch would win her first eight races and later would be voted U.S. Champion Two-Year-Old Filly for 1947. Keeneland honored this fine champion with the running of the inaugural Bewitch Stakes, a two-year-old filly event on closing day of the spring meeting on 24 April 1962 with Bonnie's Girl winning by  lengths in a time of 48 seconds for the about four furlong distance. Bonnie's Girl would finish second the following year in the Kentucky Oaks which was won by Sally Ship.

In 1965 the distance of the event was set at  furlongs with the extension of the chute which is now known as the Headley Course.  The number of two-year-old fillies that would enter the event was high which would enable Keeneland to split the event into divisions. This occurred in 1965, 1966, 1971, 1972 and 1976. The last time the event was held as a two-year-old stakes race was in 1978.

In 1979 the event was held with conditions for fillies and mares that are four years old or older and the distance was set at  miles. 

In 1982 the American Graded Stakes Committee upgraded the race to its current Grade III status.

Between 1979 and 1985 when the event was held on the dirt track three winners of the race had earlier had won the Apple Blossom Handicap at Oaklawn Park – Miss Baja scored a major upset at Oaklawn in 1979, confirmed her victory by winning by the Bewitch Stakes by  lengths, Bold 'n Determined in 1981 and Heatherten in 1984.

Keeneland installed a new turf track in the fall of 1985 and in the following spring meeting (1986) the event was moved as was the Elkhorn Stakes (for all horses) and scheduled as a  miles event.

In 1995 the distance of the event was increased to  miles.

The event was not held 2020 during Keeneland's spring meeting which was moved to July and shortened due to the COVID-19 pandemic in the United States.

Records

Speed  record
 miles turf: 2:27.54 – Bursting Forth (1999) 
 miles turf: 1:48.37 – La Gueriere  (1992)
 miles dirt: 1:43.00 – Miss Baja (1979), Jolie Dutch (1980)
 furlongs dirt: 0:51.00 – Royality Note (1968)

Margins
9 lengths –  Shore (1966)

Most wins:
 2 – War Like Goddess (2021, 2022)

Most wins by a jockey
 6 – Pat Day (1983, 1988, 1991, 1994, 1995, 1997)

Most wins by an owner

 2 – Bwamazon Farm   (1963, 1978)
 2 – Patricia Blass  (1973, 1976)
 2 – Mrs. Bertram Firestone (1982, 1989)
 2 – William S. Farish III (1994, 1997)
 2 – Gary A. Tanaka (2003, 2006)
 2 – Barbara Hunter  (1971, 2011)
 2 – Martin S. Schwartz (2005, 2016)
 2 – George Krikorian (2021, 2022)

Most wins by a trainer
 5 –  	Doug M. Davis Jr.  (1964, 1972 (twice), 1973, 1976)
 5 –  	William I. Mott (1984, 1989, 1993, 2021, 2022)

Winners

Legend:

 
 

Notes:

§ Ran as an entry

† In the 2015 running of the event  Kitten's Point  was first past the post and wagering was paid out as the winner, however the horse returned a positive swab for  methocarbamol (Robaxin) and consequently was disqualified from the prizemoney and was placed 14th (last). Cay Dancer (GB) was declared the official winner of the event.

See also 
 List of American and Canadian Graded races

External links 
 2020 Keeneland Media Guide

References

Graded stakes races in the United States
Grade 3 stakes races in the United States
Flat horse races for four-year-old fillies
Turf races in the United States
Long-distance horse races for fillies and mares
Recurring sporting events established in 1962
Keeneland horse races
1962 establishments in Kentucky